Choristoneura expansiva is a species of moth of the family Tortricidae. It is found in Fujian, China.

The length of the forewings is 17–18.5 mm for males and 25–26.5 mm for females. The ground colour of the forewings is greyish fulvous (tawny) with some scattered short strigulae (fine streaks). The hindwings are dark grey.

Etymology
The species name refers to the distally expanded uncus and is derived from Latin expansivus (meaning expanded).

References

Moths described in 2008
Choristoneura